Kamchuga is a rural locality (a village) in Medvedevskoye Rural Settlement, Totemsky  District, Vologda Oblast, Russia. The population was 23 as of 2002.

Geography 
Kamchuga is located 30 km northeast of Totma (the district's administrative centre) by road. Kamchuga (settlement) is the nearest rural locality.

References 

Rural localities in Tarnogsky District